Richard A. "Bo" Dietl (born December 4, 1950) is an American retired  NYPD police detective, a media personality and actor. Dietl is the founder and CEO of Beau Dietl & Associates and Beau Dietl Consulting Services.

Early life and police career 
Bo Dietl was born in Queens on December 4, 1950 as the youngest of four siblings. He was raised in Richmond Hill and Ozone Park, Queens. After graduating Richmond Hill High School, he worked as a unionized concrete laborer and iron worker, working on the original World Trade Center. He later joined the New York City Police Department, where he worked for fifteen years. While on the force, he became a high profile detective, making over 1,400 felony arrests, and was awarded 62 medals by the department. He also become a decoy in which he was mugged over 500 times and had 30 line of duty injuries. He retired in 1985.

Film, television, and radio
In 1998, Dietl's autobiography One Tough Cop: The Bo Dietl Story was made into the film One Tough Cop starring Stephen Baldwin as Bo Dietl. The plot in Abel Ferrara's crime drama Bad Lieutenant is mainly inspired by Dietl's 1981 investigation of the rape of a young nun.

Dietl has appeared in three Martin Scorsese films: as the detective who arrests Henry Hill in Goodfellas (1990), as himself in The Wolf of Wall Street (2013), and as labor leader and mob boss Joseph Glimco in The Irishman (2019).

An interview with Dietl is included in the documentary Fabled Enemies by Jason Bermas of Loose Change fame. Dietl speaks about his relationship with FBI agent John P. O'Neill who was the leading expert on Osama bin Laden until his resignation from the FBI in August 2001 to become head of security at the World Trade Center, where he was killed in the September 11 attacks.

Dietl was an associate producer for The Bone Collector and producer for the movie Table One.

Dietl was a frequent guest of Don Imus on the Imus in the Morning radio program on WABC radio. He appears regularly on Fox News Channel shows, including Hannity and Geraldo at Large. He had also appeared on The Daily Show with Jon Stewart, The O'Reilly Factor, and had a guest role on the NBC crime drama Law & Order.

Dietl is currently the host of One Tough Podcast.

Politics
The Republican and Conservative Parties of New York State for the 6th Congressional District nominated Dietl for the U.S. Congress in 1986.

In 1994, Governor George Pataki appointed Dietl chairman of the New York State Security Guard Advisory Council.

He served as security consultant to the Republican National Convention and as director of security for the New York State Republican Convention.

On December 6, 2010, Dietl joined Fox News contributors Joel Mowbray and Bob Beckel in calling for the assassination of Julian Assange.

In 2014, Dietl announced his intention to run for Mayor of New York City in 2017, initially intending to run in the Democratic primary against incumbent Mayor Bill de Blasio.  In February 2017, Dietl announced he would no longer be challenging de Blasio in the primaries, running instead as an independent, due to a paperwork filing error.  He received approximately 1% of the total vote,  finishing in sixth place.

Dietl has worked as a private investigator on behalf of numerous high profile conservative personalities, including Steve Bannon and Don Imus. On May 4, 2017, The Wall Street Journal reported that Dietl said he was hired by Fox News network management to discredit the harassment claims by former anchor Gretchen Carlson and former producer Andrea Mackris against Roger Ailes and Bill O'Reilly. After this was reported, Dietl ceased to be a contributor to Fox News.

References

External links
Beau Dietl & Associates

American radio personalities
New York City Police Department officers
Living people
1950 births
People from Queens, New York
New York (state) Republicans
American chief executives
New York (state) Independents
New York (state) Democrats